About three kilometers east of Takht Sri Harmandir Sahib is where Guru Tegh Bahadur first alighted in a garden (bagh)  belonging to Nawabs Rahim Bakhsh and Karim Bakhsh, nobles of Patna, and where the sangat of Patna along with the young Guru Gobind Singh came out to receive him back from his four-year-long odyssey. A shrine commemorative of the first meeting of  Tegh Bahadur and Gobind Singh was established here. Its present building was constructed during the 1970s and 1980s. An old well which is still in use and a dried stump of the Imli tree under which the sangat met Guru Tegh Bahadur still exists.

See also
Akal Takht
Takht Sri Keshgarh Sahib
Takht Sri Damdama Sahib
Takht Sri Hazur Sahib
Takhat Shiri Patna Sahib

References

External links
 Gurdwara Guru ka Bagh
 Sri Dasam Granth , The Sri Dasam Granth Sahib website

Religious buildings and structures in Patna
Gurdwaras in Bihar
20th-century gurdwaras
20th-century architecture in India